The 310th Space Wing is an Air Reserve Component (ARC) of the United States Air Force.  It is assigned to the Tenth Air Force, Air Force Reserve Command, stationed at Schriever Space Force Base, Colorado. The wing is the only space wing in the Air Force Reserve. It provides specialized expertise, continuity and combat ready personnel. It is mission partnered with several United States Space Force deltas: Space Delta 2, Space Delta 3, Space Delta 4, and Space Launch Delta 30.

The wing is commanded by Colonel Traci L. Kueker-Murphy. Its Command Chief Master Sergeant is Chief Master Sergeant Imelda B. Johnson.

The wing has a long and rich heritage dating back to World War II, when it began as the 310th Bombardment Group on 15 March 1942, flying North American B-25 Mitchell medium bombers. In October 1942, the 310th was the first 12th Air Force group sent overseas, initially to England and then to French Morocco, Algeria, Tunisia, France, and Italy where it participated in the European-African-Middle Eastern Campaign. The 310th Bombardment Group was inactivated in September 1945.

Overview
The 310th Bombardment Wing was reactivated in 1952 as part of Strategic Air Command. It trained on the Boeing B-29 Superfortress before converting to the Boeing B-47 Stratojet. It was inactivated in June 1965 with the phaseout of the B-47 from the U.S. Air Force inventory.

The 310th became part of Air Force Space Command in 1991 when the 310th Training and Test Wing was activated for a short time at Vandenberg Space Force Base, Calif.; the 310th designator was again activated with the stand up of the 310th Space Group on 4 September 1997. The 310th Space Group was re-designated the 310th Space Wing on 7 March 2008.

Subordinate units
The wing is composed of the 310th Operations Group, 710th Operations Group, and 310th Mission Support Group, that support various military and other government organizations including, but not limited to, the Department of Commerce, United States Space Force, Space Operations Command, 50th Space Wing, 21st Space Wing, and 460th Space Wing.
 310th Operations Group
 6th Space Operations Squadron (Defense Meteorological Satellite Program backup for NOAA)
 7th Space Operations Squadron (associate unit to 1st Space Operations Squadron)
 9th Combat Operations Squadron (supports the Combined Space Operations Center at Vandenberg Space Force Base)
 19th Space Operations Squadron (associate unit to 2 SOPS)
 310th Operations Support Squadron (provides operations support and applicable program oversight to the space operations squadrons)
 710th Operations Group
 380th Space Control Squadron (associate unit to 16th Space Control Squadron at Peterson Space Force Base)
 8th Space Warning Squadron (operates Space-Based Infrared System at Buckley Space Force Base)
 Detachment 1 8th Space Warning Squadron
 310th Mission Support Group
 310th Security Forces Squadron
 710th Security Forces Squadron
 310th Force Support Squadron
 310th Communications Flight (associate unit to 561st Network Operations Squadron (INOSC West) at Peterson Space Force Base)
 Reserve National Security Space Institute (associate unit to the NSSI)

History

World War II

The unit was constituted as the 310th Bombardment Group (Medium) on 28 January 1942 and activated on 15 March 1942. Used B-25s in preparing for duty overseas.

Moved to the Mediterranean theater by single aircraft between October 1942 and March 1943 and assigned to Twelfth Air Force. Sufficient aircraft were on hand by 2 December, when it conducted its first operation against antiaircraft concentrations at Gabes, Tunisia. Engaged primarily in support and interdictory operations in Tunisia, Sicily, Italy, Corsica, Sardinia, and southern France. The 310th Bomb Group also flew some missions to Austria and Yugoslavia.

The unit attacked harbors and shipping to help defeat Axis forces in North Africa, December 1942 – May 1943. Bombed airdromes, landing grounds, and gun emplacements on Pantelleria, Lampedusa, and Sicily, May–July 1943. The unit supported the Allied landing at Salerno, September 1943. Assisted the drive toward Rome, January–June 1944.

Supported the invasion of Southern France, August 1944. Struck German communications— bridges, rail lines, marshalling yards, viaducts, tunnels, and road junctions in Italy, August 1943 – April 1945. Also dropped propaganda leaflets behind enemy lines.

The 310th Bomb Group received a Distinguished Unit Citation for a mission to Italy on 27 August 1943 when, in spite of persistent attacks by enemy interceptors and antiaircraft artillery, the group effectively bombed marshalling yards at Benevento and also destroyed a number of enemy planes. Received second DUC for another mission in Italy on 10 March 1945 when the group, maintaining a compact formation in the face of severe antiaircraft fire, bombed the railroad bridge at Ora, a vital link in the German supply line.

The 310th Bomb Group was inactivated in Italy on 12 September 1945.

The unit was redesignated the 310th Bombardment Group, Light and allotted to the reserve. Activated in the US on 27 December 1946. Inactivated on 27 June 1949.

Cold War
The 310th Bombardment Wing was activated in 1952 as a Strategic Air Command unit, receiving Boeing B-29 Superfortress bombardment training from 90th Bombardment Wing, April–August 1952. From February through May 1953, the 310th Bomb Wing provided bombardment training to the 40th Bombardment Wing.

The wing replaced the propeller-driven B-29s with new Boeing B-47E Stratojet swept-wing medium bombers in 1954, capable of flying at high subsonic speeds and primarily designed for penetrating the airspace of the Soviet Union. It participated in SAC REFLEX deployments, deploying to RAF Upper Heyford 10 March – 8 June 1955, and at RAF Greenham Common, 3 October 1956 – 9 January 1957, both in the United Kingdom.

The wing gained a strategic missile squadron in April 1961. First CGM-16 Atlas missiles went on alert in September 1962. In the early 1960s, the B-47 was considered to be reaching obsolescence, and was being phased out of SAC's strategic arsenal. B-47s began being sent to AMARC at Davis–Monthan in early 1965; was inactivated in late June.

Air Force Space Command

On 1 September 1991, the third wing to hold the "310" designation, the 310th Training and Test Wing (310 TTW), assumed the ICBM testing and training mission from the Strategic Missile Center (the former 1st Strategic Aerospace Division) at Vandenberg AFB, California under the Twentieth Air Force. After the removal of ICBMs from alert status at the end of the Cold War, the wing continued to train Minuteman crews and to test accuracy and reliability of Minuteman and Peacekeeper missiles. The 310 TTW also assisted in testing the Global Positioning System (GPS) from April 1992 – May 1992. It was reassigned to Air Combat Command on 31 May 1992. It was inactivated on 1 July 1993.

The number 310 was again reutilized with the stand up of the 310th Space Group on 4 September 1997. The group was created around its original squadron, the 7th SOPS, and has grown rapidly with the realization of the critical role the Air Force Reserve can play in the future of space operations. The group has been tremendously successful in its initial missions and has been tasked with reviewing future active/Reserve partnerships in space to identify potential areas where the AF Reserve can add value in the space arena.

In 2008 Air Force Reserve Command officials upgraded the group to a wing at what was then Schriever Air Force Base, CO. The 310th Space Wing was activated on 7 March 2008.

Lineage
 310th Bombardment Group
 Established as the 310th Bombardment Group (Medium) on 28 January 1942
 Activated on 15 March 1942
 Redesignated 310th Bombardment Group, Medium on 20 August 1943
 Inactivated on 12 September 1945
 Redesignated 310th Bombardment Group, Light and activated in the reserve on 27 December 1946.
 Inactivated on 27 June 1949
 Consolidated with the 310th Strategic Aerospace Wing as the 310th Strategic Aerospace Wing on 31 January 1984

 310th Space Wing
 Established as the 310th Bombardment Wing, Medium on 15 March 1952
 Activated on 28 March 1952
 Redesignated 310th Strategic Aerospace Wing on 1 March 1962
 Discontinued and inactivated on 25 June 1965
 Consolidated with the 310th Bombardment Group on 31 January 1984 (remained inactive)
 Redesignated 310th Training and Test Wing on 29 August 1991
 Activated on 1 September 1991
 Inactivated on 1 July 1993
 Redesignated 310th Space Group on 22 August 1997
 Activated in the reserve on 1 September 1997
 Redesignated 310th Space Wing on 7 March 2008

Assignments

 III Bomber Command, 28 March 1942
 XII Bomber Command, 2 May 1942 (attached to 7th Fighter Wing, after 1 February 1943)
 7 Fighter Wing (later 47th Bombardment Wing), 18 February 1943
 XII Fighter Command, 3 November 1943
 57th Bombardment Wing, 20 March 1944
 Twelfth Air Force, 10 August 1945
 Air Force Service Command, Mediterranean Theater of Operations, 15 August – 12 September 1945
 First Air Force, 27 December 1946
 3d Bombardment Wing (later 3d Air Division), 17 October 1947 – 27 June 1949

 Fifteenth Air Force, 28 March 1952 (attached to 21st Air Division)
 802d Air Division, 28 May 1952 (attached to 21st Air Division until 4 September 1952, attached to 7th Air Division, 10 March – 8 June 1955 and 3 October 1956 – 9 January 1957
 819th Air Division (later 819th Strategic Aerospace Division), 20 June 1960
 22d Strategic Aerospace Division, 1 July 1962 – 25 June 1965
 Twentieth Air Force, 1 September 1991 – 1 July 1993
 Tenth Air Force, 1 September 1997 – present

Stations

 Davis–Monthan Air Force Base, Arizona, 15 March 1942
 Jackson Army Air Base, Mississippi, 15 March 1942
 Key Field, Mississippi, c. 25 April 1942
 Columbia Army Air Base, South Carolina, 17 May 1942
 Walterboro Army Air Field, South Carolina, 14 August 1942
 Greenville Army Air Base, South Carolina, 18 September – 17 October 1942 (ground echelon)
 RAF Hardwick, England, September–November 1942 (air echelon)
 Mediouna Airfield, French Morocco, 18 November 1942
 Telergma Airfield, Algeria, 21 December 1942
 Berteaux Airfield, Algeria, 1 January 1943
 Dar el Koudia Airfield, Tunisia, c. 6 June 1943

 Menzel Temime Airfield, Tunisia, c. 5 August 1943
 Philippeville Airfield, Algeria, 10 November 1943
 Ghisonaccia Airfield, Corsica, c. 10 December 1943
 Fano Airfield, Italy, 7 April 1945
 Pomigliano Airfield, Italy, c. 15 August – 12 September 1945
 Bedford Army Air Field, Massachusetts, 27 December 1946 – 27 June 1949
 Forbes Air Force Base, Kansas, 28 March 1952
 Smoky Hill Air Force Base (later Schilling Air Force Base), Kansas, 4 September 1952 – 25 June 1965
 Vandenberg Air Force Base, California, 1 September 1991 – 1 July 1993
 Falcon Air Force Base (later Schriever Space Force Base, Colorado, 1 September 1997 – present

Components
Wings
 40th Bombardment Wing: attached 6 February – 1 May 1953

Groups
 310th Operations Group: 1 September 1991 – 1 July 1993, 7 March 2008 – present
 710th Operations Group: c. 1 October 2017 – present

Squadrons

 6th Space Operations Squadron: 1 October 1998 – present
 7th Space Operations Squadron: 1 September 1997 – present
 8th Space Operations Squadron (later 8th Space Warning Squadron) : 1 September 1997 – 1 October 1998, 1 October 1999 – 7 March 2008
 9th Combat Operations Squadron: 1 October 1999 – present
 39th Reconnaissance Squadron (later 428th Bombardment Squadron: 15 March 1942 – 12 September 1945, 1 February 1959 – 1 January 1962
 40th Air Refueling Squadron: attached 9 September 1952 – 30 April 1953, assigned 1 June 1960 – 15 March 1963
 310th Air Refueling Squadron: 8 October 1952 – 25 June 1965

 379th Bombardment Squadron: 15 March 1942 – 12 September 1945, 11 June 1947 – 27 June 1949, 28 March 1952 – 25 March 1965
 380th Bombardment Squadron: 15 March 1942 – 12 September 1945, 9 August 1947 – 27 June 1949, 28 March 1952 – 25 March 1965
 381st Bombardment Squadron: 15 March 1942 – 12 September 1945, 9 August 1947 – 27 June 1949, 28 March 1952 – 25 March 1965
 550th Strategic Missile Squadron: 1 April 1961 – 25 June 1965

Aircraft, Missiles, and Satellites Operated
 North American B-25 Mitchell, (1942–1945)
 Boeing B-29 Superfortress (1952–1954)
 Boeing KC-97 Stratofreighter (1952–1963)
 Boeing B-47 Stratojet (1954–1965)
 CGM-16 Atlas (1962–1965)
 Boeing KC-135 Stratotanker (1964–1965)
 Defense Meteorological Satellite Program (1997–present)
 Global Positioning System (1997–present)
 Space-Based Infrared System (2006–present)

List of commanders

See also

 List of B-29 Superfortress operators
 List of B-47 units of the United States Air Force
 521st Air Service Group Support unit for the group in World War II

References

Notes

Bibliography

 
 
 
 310th Space Wing Factsheet

Space wings of the United States Air Force
Military units and formations established in 2008